Eloy  is a 1969 Argentine film directed by Humberto Ríos.

It was filmed in San Diego, Viña del Mar, Santiago de Chile and Buenos Aires.

References

External links
 

1969 films
Argentine drama films
1960s Spanish-language films
1960s Argentine films